Elections to Winchester City Council took place on 3 May 2018. This was on the same day as other local elections across the United Kingdom.

Result Summary

An election was not held this year in St Luke as it is a two-member ward, with both seats previously having been up for election with the 2016 Election, and one of the seats next up for the election in 2019. Colden Common and Twyford is similarly a two-member ward, but did hold an election this time.

Ward results

Alresford & Itchen Valley

Badger Farm & Oliver's Battery

Bishops Waltham

Central Meon Valley

Colden Common & Twyford

Denmead

Southwick & Wickham

St Barnabas

St Bartholomew

St Michael

St Paul

The Worthys

Upper Meon Valley

Whiteley & Shedfield

Wonston & Mitcheldever

By-Elections

Upper Meon Valley
A by-election was held in Upper Meon Valley ward on 20 September 2018 after the resignation of Councillor Amber Tresahar.

References

2018
2018 English local elections